Upper Closter–Alpine Historic District is located in Alpine, Bergen County, New Jersey, United States. The district was added to the National Register of Historic Places on May 8, 1985.

References

Alpine, New Jersey
Geography of Bergen County, New Jersey
National Register of Historic Places in Bergen County, New Jersey
Historic districts on the National Register of Historic Places in New Jersey
New Jersey Register of Historic Places